Clandestine abuse is sexual, psychological, or physical abuse "that is kept secret for a purpose, concealed, or underhanded."

Child sexual abuse is often kept secret:

Prevention

While it is not always possible to stop every case of clandestine abuse, it may be possible to prevent many incidents through policies in youth organizations.

The social isolation model asserts that:

The BSA policy states:

Other policies of the BSA state:

Drug crimes
A person, especially a child, may be abused in secret because the victim has witnessed another clandestine crime, such as a working Methamphetamine laboratory.  The FBI concluded that "A coordinated multidisciplinary team is critical to ensure that the needs of meth’s youngest victims are met and that adequate information is available to prosecute child endangerment cases successfully."

See also
 Cruelty
 Emotional blackmail
 Victimology

References

External links
 Guidelines for Department of Justice personnel on how to treat crime victims and witnesses
 NY State Coalition Against DV
 NY Crime Victim's Board
 Albany County Crime Victim and Sexual Violence Center

Abuse
Aggression
Secrecy